Hooking is a penalty in ice hockey and ringette. This article deals chiefly with ice hockey.

The National Hockey League defines it in Rule 55 as "the act of using the stick in a manner that enables a player or goalkeeper to restrain an opponent."

Hooking in the rules

The NHL covers hooking in Rule 55, which defines it as "the act of using the stick in a manner that enables a player or goalkeeper to restrain an opponent." It goes on to specify that "when a player is checking another in such a way that there is only stick-to-stick contact, such action is not to be penalized as hooking." The NHL groups hooking with other "Restraining fouls" such as holding, interference and tripping.

The IIHF covers hooking in Rule 533, defining a player guilty of hooking as one "who impedes or seeks to impede the progress of an opponent by hooking him with the stick."

Both codes allow for hooking to be penalized with either a minor or major penalty; the latter is imposed for injuring an opponent by hooking, and carries with it an automatic game misconduct.

Emphasis in NHL

Following the 2004–05 NHL lockout, the NHL made "Zero tolerance on Interference, Hooking and Holding/Obstruction" its top priority for game officials. Since that time the league and its officials have made a significant effort to follow up on that priority, and the game is being played in a more open style as a result.

References

Ice hockey penalties
Ice hockey terminology

fr:Accrocher (hockey sur glace)